Death of everything may refer to:

 Heat death of everything, a hypothesis on the ultimate fate of the universe
 Global catastrophe scenarios, events which may threaten life on Earth
 The Death of Everything, a 1988 album by The Three Johns
 The Death of Everything, a 2006 demo album by Sean McGrath

See also 
 Extinction Event (disambiguation)
 Extinction Level Event (disambiguation)
 End of Everything, a 2000s Scottish band
 "Everything Dies", a 2009 single by Type O Negative
 Timeline of the far future
 Ultimate fate of the universe